Two Japanese destroyers have been named Suzunami:

Japanese Navy ship names